Huang, Earl of Cai, born Ji Huang, was an ancient Chinese noble from the Zhou dynasty and the third ruler of the ancient Chinese state of Cai.

Huang was the only known son of Zhong Hu of Cai and the second cousin of Kings Cheng and Kang of Zhou. His son inherited his land as Marquis Gōng of Cai, with a higher title, hou rather than bo.

See also
Shiji

External links
http://ctext.org/dictionary.pl?if=en&char=%E8%94%A1%E4%BC%AF%E8%8D%92
http://www.chinaknowledge.de/History/Zhou/rulers-cai.html

11th century BC in China
Zhou dynasty nobility
Cai (state)
11th-century BC Chinese monarchs